Potassium voltage-gated channel, shaker-related subfamily, member 3, also known as KCNA3 or Kv1.3, is a protein that in humans is encoded by the KCNA3 gene.

Potassium channels represent the most complex class of voltage-gated ion channels from both functional and structural standpoints. Their diverse functions include regulating neurotransmitter release, heart rate, insulin secretion, neuronal excitability, epithelial electrolyte transport, smooth muscle contraction, and cell volume. Four sequence-related potassium channel genes – shaker, shaw, shab, and shal – have been identified in Drosophila, and each has been shown to have human homolog(s).

This gene encodes a member of the potassium channel, voltage-gated, shaker-related subfamily. This member contains six membrane-spanning domains with a shaker-type repeat in the fourth segment. It belongs to the delayed rectifier class, members of which allow nerve cells to efficiently repolarize following an action potential. It plays an essential role in T cell proliferation and activation. This gene appears to be intronless and is clustered together with KCNA2 and KCNA10 genes on chromosome 1.

Function 

KCNA3 encodes the voltage-gated Kv1.3 channel, which is expressed in T and B lymphocytes.  All human T cells express roughly 300 Kv1.3 channels per cell along with 10-20 calcium-activated KCa3.1 channels. Upon activation, naive and central memory T cells increase expression of the KCa3.1 channel to approximately 500 channels per cell, while effector-memory T cells increase expression of the Kv1.3 channel. Among human B cells, naive and early memory B cells express small numbers of Kv1.3 and KCa3.1 channels when they are quiescent, and augment KCa3.1 expression after activation. In contrast, class-switched memory B cells express high numbers of Kv1.3 channels per cell (about 1500/cell) and this number increases after activation.

Kv1.3 is physically coupled through a series of adaptor proteins to the T-cell receptor signaling complex and it traffics to the immunological synapse during antigen presentation. However, blockade of the channel does not prevent immune synapse formation.  Kv1.3 and KCa3.1 regulate membrane potential and calcium signaling of T cells. Calcium entry through the CRAC channel is promoted by potassium efflux through the Kv1.3 and KCa3.1 potassium channels.

Blockade of Kv1.3 channels in effector-memory T cells suppresses calcium signaling, cytokine production (interferon-gamma, interleukin 2) and cell proliferation. In vivo, Kv1.3 blockers paralyze effector-memory T cells at the sites of inflammation and prevent their reactivation in inflamed tissues.  In contrast, Kv1.3 blockers do not affect the homing to and motility within lymph nodes of naive and central memory T cells, most likely because these cells express the KCa3.1 channel and are, therefore, protected from the effect of Kv1.3 blockade.

Kv1.3 has been reported to be expressed in the inner mitochondrial membrane in lymphocytes. The apoptotic protein Bax has been suggested to insert into the outer mitochondrial membrane and occlude the pore of Kv1.3 via a lysine residue. Thus, Kv1.3 modulation may be one of many mechanisms that contribute to apoptosis.

Clinical significance

Autoimmune 

In patients with multiple sclerosis (MS), disease-associated myelin-specific T cells from the blood are predominantly co-stimulation-independent effector-memory T cells that express high numbers of Kv1.3 channels. T cells in MS lesions in postmortem brain lesions are also predominantly effector-memory T cells that express high levels of the Kv1.3 channel.  In children with type-1 diabetes mellitus, the disease-associated insulin- and GAD65-specific T cells isolated from the blood are effector-memory T cells that express high numbers of Kv1.3 channels, and the same is true of T cells from the synovial joint fluid of patients with rheumatoid arthritis. T cells with other antigen specificities in these patients were naive or central memory T cells that upregulate the KCa3.1 channel upon activation. Consequently, it should be possible to selectively suppress effector-memory T cells with a Kv1.3-specific blocker and thereby ameliorate many autoimmune diseases without compromising the protective immune response. In proof-of-concept studies, Kv1.3 blockers have prevented and treated disease in rat models of multiple sclerosis, type-1 diabetes mellitus, rheumatoid arthritis, contact dermatitis, and delayed-type hypersensitivity.

At therapeutic concentrations, the blockers did not cause any clinically evident toxicity in rodents, and it did not compromise the protective immune response to acute influenza viral infection and acute chlamydia bacterial infection. Many groups are developing Kv1.3 blockers for the treatment of autoimmune diseases.

Metabolic 

Kv1.3 is also considered a therapeutic target for the treatment of obesity, for enhancing peripheral insulin sensitivity in patients with type-2 diabetes mellitus, and for preventing bone resorption in periodontal disease. A genetic variation in the Kv1.3 promoter region is associated with low insulin sensitivity and impaired glucose tolerance.

Neurodegeneration 

Kv1.3 channels have been found to be highly expressed by activated and plaque-associated microglia in human Alzheimer’s disease (AD) post-mortem brains  as well as in mouse models of AD pathology. Patch-clamp recordings and flow cytometric studies performed on acutely isolated mouse microglia have confirmed upregulation of Kv1.3 channels with disease progression in mouse AD models.  The Kv1.3 channel gene has also been found to be a regulator of pro-inflammatory microglial responses. Selective blockade of Kv1.3 channels by the small molecule Pap1 as well as a peptide sea anemone toxin-based peptide ShK-223 have been found to limit amyloid beta plaque burden in mouse AD models, potentially via augmented clearance by microglia.

Blockers

Kv1.3 is blocked by several peptides from venomous creatures including scorpions (ADWX1, OSK1, margatoxin, kaliotoxin, charybdotoxin, noxiustoxin, anuroctoxin, OdK2) and sea anemone (ShK, ShK-F6CA, ShK-186, ShK-192,  BgK), and by small molecule compounds (e.g., PAP-1, Psora-4, correolide, benzamides, CP339818, progesterone and the anti-lepromatous drug clofazimine). The Kv1.3 blocker clofazimine has been reported to be effective in the treatment of chronic graft-versus-host disease, cutaneous lupus, and pustular psoriasis in humans. Furthermore, clofazimine in combination with the antibiotics clarithromycin and rifabutin induced remission for about 2 years in patients with Crohn's disease, but the effect was temporary; the effect was thought to be due to anti-mycobacterial activity, but could well have been an immunomodulatory effect by clofazimine.

See also 
 Voltage-gated potassium channel

References

External links 
 
 

Ion channels